Niklas Fogström (born March 2, 1982) is a Finnish ice hockey player. He is currently playing with Storhamar Ishockey in the Norwegian GET-ligaen.

Fogström made his Swedish Hockey League debut playing with Luleå HF during the 2012–13 season.

Career statistics

References

External links

1982 births
Living people
Finnish ice hockey centres
Färjestad BK players
Forshaga IF players
Linköping HC players
Lukko players
Luleå HF players
Mora IK players
Nyköpings Hockey players
Sportspeople from Vaasa
Storhamar Dragons players
Tingsryds AIF players
Vaasan Sport players